Tuchet is a surname, and may refer to:

John Tuchet, 4th Baron Audley (1371–1408) (abeyance terminated 1408 (or 1403?))
James Touchet, 5th Baron Audley (c. 1398 – 1459)
John Tuchet, 6th Baron Audley (died 1490)
James Tuchet, 7th Baron Audley (c. 1463 – 1497) (forfeit 1497)
John Tuchet, 8th Baron Audley (c. 1483 – 1558) (restored 1512)
George Tuchet, 9th Baron Audley (died 1560)
Henry Tuchet, 10th Baron Audley (died 1563)
 George Tuchet, 1st Earl of Castlehaven (c. 1551 – 1616), Baron Audley
 Mervyn Tuchet, 2nd Earl of Castlehaven (1593–1631), Baron Audley
 James Tuchet, 3rd Earl of Castlehaven (c. 1617 – 1684), Baron Audley of Hely
 Mervyn Tuchet, 4th Earl of Castlehaven (died 1686), Baron in the Peerage of England
 James Tuchet, 5th Earl of Castlehaven (died 1700), Baron in the Peerage of England
 James Tuchet, 6th Earl of Castlehaven (died 1740), Baron in the Peerage of England
 James Tuchet, 7th Earl of Castlehaven (1723–1769), Baron in the Peerage of England
 John Tuchet, 8th Earl of Castlehaven (1724–1777), Baron Audley

See also

 Baron Tuchet
 Tuchet-Jesson
 Earl of Castlehaven
 Baron Audley